Jack William Durrant (born 6 May 1991) is an English footballer, who plays as a defender.

Career
Durrant started his career as a youth player in Cheltenham Town's under-16 team, before signing a scholarship in 2007 with the club. In November 2008, he was loaned out to Southern Football League Premier Division team Mangotsfield United for one-month. He made his first team debut in the FA Cup third round replay away against Doncaster Rovers, on 20 January 2009. Durrant replaced Dave Bird as a substitute in the 77th minute in the 3–0 defeat. He made his Football League debut in a League One match against Leicester City in the 4–0 away defeat on 7 March, replacing Josh Low as a substitute in the 72nd minute. He was released by the club along with seven other players in May 2010.

On 2 August 2011, he signed on to Southern Football League Division One South & West club Didcot Town from Bridgwater Town, before moving on to Bitton and then to Bishop Sutton.

References

External links
Jack Durrant profile at ctfc.com

1991 births
Living people
Footballers from Bristol
English footballers
Association football defenders
Cheltenham Town F.C. players
Mangotsfield United F.C. players
Didcot Town F.C. players
Bridgwater Town F.C. players
Bitton A.F.C. players
Bishop Sutton A.F.C. players
Bristol Manor Farm F.C. players
English Football League players
Southern Football League players